Roots of American Order is a book written by Russell Kirk, originally published in 1974. The book is now published by the Intercollegiate Studies Institute (ISI Books).

In the book, Kirk traces the basic theories that underpin American civilization to ancient Jerusalem, Athens, Rome, and London and suggests that the ideas on which modern America has been built have their roots in these ancient civilizations, passed down through the Greek, Roman, Early Christian, and British civilizations through to the Founding Fathers of the United States.

References

External links
Roots Of American Order by Russell Kirk (ISI Books, 1974, Reprint: 2003)

History books about the United States
Conservative media in the United States